The National Film Award for Best Cinematography is one of the National Film Awards presented annually by the Directorate of Film Festivals, the organisation set up by Ministry of Information and Broadcasting, India. It is one of several awards presented for feature films and awarded with Rajat Kamal (Silver Lotus).

The award was instituted in 1967, at 15th National Film Awards and awarded annually for films produced in the year across the country, in all Indian languages. Till 34th National Film Awards, awards were given for Black-and-white as well as Color motion picture film. Since 37th National Film Awards, Laboratory Processing are also awarded under the same category.

Multiple Winners 
4 wins : K. K. Mahajan, Santosh Sivan

3 wins : Soumendu Roy, Apurba Kishore Bir, Venu, Madhu Ambat, Abhik Mukhopadhyay

2 wins : Ramachandra, Balu Mahendra, Ashok Mehta, Sudeep Chatterjee

Recipients 

Award includes 'Rajat Kamal' (Silver Lotus) and cash prize. The only female who has won this award is Anjuli Shukla, who won the award for her debut film, Kutty Srank (2010). Prasad Film Lab has been awarded eight times for the laboratory processing. Following are the award winners over the years:

References

External links 
 Official Page for Directorate of Film Festivals, India
 National Film Awards Archives

Cinematography
Awards for best cinematography